This is a list of events related to British television in 1937.

Events

January
19 January – BBC Television broadcasts The Underground Murder Mystery by J. Bissell Thomas from its London station, the first play written for television.

February
6 February – The BBC Television Service drops the Baird system in favour of the Marconi-EMI 405 lines system.

March
No events.

April
No events.

May
12 May – The BBC use their outside broadcast unit for the first time, to televise the coronation of King George VI and Queen Elizabeth. A fragment of this broadcast is one of the earliest surviving examples of British television, filmed off-screen at home by an engineer with an 8 mm cine camera. A short section of this footage is used in a programme during the week of the 1953 coronation of Queen Elizabeth II and this latter programme survives in the BBC's archives.
14 May – The BBC Television Service broadcasts a thirty-minute excerpt of Twelfth Night, the first known instance of a Shakespeare play on television. Among the cast are Greer Garson and Peggy Ashcroft who appears in a 1939 telecast of the entire play.

June
18 June – Broadcast of the Agatha Christie play Wasp's Nest, the only instance of Christie adapting one of her works for television, a medium she later came to dislike.
21 June – Wimbledon Championships (tennis) first shown on the BBC Television Service.

July
No events.

August
No events.

September
16 September – Football is televised for the first time. It is a specially-arranged friendly match between Arsenal and Arsenal Reserves at Highbury.

October
No events.

November
11 November (Armistice Day) – BBC Television devotes the evening to a broadcast of Journey's End by R. C. Sherriff (1928, set on the Western Front (World War I) in 1918), the first full-length television adaptation of a stage play and the first time that a whole evening's programming has been given over to a single play. Reginald Tate plays the lead, Stanhope, a role he has performed extensively in the theatre.

December
31 December – 2,121 television sets have been sold in England.

Debuts
19 January – The Underground Murder Mystery (1937)
12 April – Cabaret Cruise (1937-1939; 1946; 1949)
17 April – The Disorderly Room (1937–1939)
24 April – For the Children (1937–1939, 1946–1952)
14 May - Twelfth Night (1937)
19 May – The School for Scandal (1937)
18 June – Wasp's Nest (1937)
7 July – How He Lied to Her Husband (1937)
21 October – Night Must Fall (1937)
11 November – Journey's End (1937)
14 December – Tele-Ho!" (1937)
20 December – The Ghost Train (1937)
Unknown – Sports Review (1937)
Unknown – Starlight (1937-1939; 1946-1949)

Continuing television shows
1920sBBC Wimbledon (1927–1939, 1946–2019, 2021–2024)

1930sPicture Page'' (1936–1939, 1946–1952)

Births
 1 January – Anne Aubrey, actress
 9 January – Michael Nicholson, journalist (died 2016)
 30 January – Vanessa Redgrave, actress
 25 February – Tom Courtenay, actor
 8 March – Justine Lord, actress
 27 March – Alan Hawkshaw, theme tune composer (died 2021)
 9 April – Valerie Singleton, presenter
 11 April – Jill Gascoine, actress and novelist (died 2020)
 1 May – Una Stubbs, actress (died 2021)
 12 May – Susan Hampshire, actress
 19 May – Pat Roach, actor and wrestler (died 2004)
 5 August – Carla Lane, comedy writer (died 2016)
 6 August – Barbara Windsor, actress (died 2020)
 18 August – Willie Rushton, comedian, actor and writer (died 1996)
 20 August – Jim Bowen, comedian and host (died 2018)
 2 September – Derek Fowlds, actor (died 2020)
 5 September – Dick Clement, comedy scriptwriter
 16 September – Bella Emberg, born Sybil Dyke, comedy actress (died 2018)
 14 November – Alan J. W. Bell, director and producer
 17 November – Peter Cook, comedian and writer (died 1995)
 27 November – Rodney Bewes, actor (died 2017)
 29 November  – Ingrid Pitt, actress (died 2010)
 20 December – Charles Denton, producer
 29 December – Barbara Steele, actress

See also
 1937 in British music
 1937 in the United Kingdom
 List of British films of 1937

References